Thomastown was a constituency represented in the Irish House of Commons until 1800. Following the Act of Union 1800 the borough was disenfranchised.

Members of Parliament
1560 Francis Cosby and Henry Colley
1585 Walter Sherlock and Robert Porter
1613–1615 Robert Porter and Nicolas Robucke
1634–1635 Patrick Sherlock and Jacob Walsh
1639–1649 Seafoule Gibson and Michael Wandesford
1661–1666 Robert Shapcote (sat for Wicklow and replaced 1661 by John Brett) and Thomas Burrell

1689–1801

See also
Thomastown, a town in County Kilkenny
Irish House of Commons 
List of Irish constituencies

References

Johnston-Liik, E. M. (2002). History of the Irish Parliament, 1692–1800, Publisher: Ulster Historical Foundation (28 Feb 2002),  
T. W. Moody, F. X. Martin, F. J. Byrne, A New History of Ireland 1534–1691, Oxford University Press, 1978

Constituencies of the Parliament of Ireland (pre-1801)
Historic constituencies in County Kilkenny
1541 establishments in Ireland
1800 disestablishments in Ireland
Constituencies established in 1541
Constituencies disestablished in 1800